The tornado outbreak of June 18–22, 2011 was a large and damaging tornado outbreak that produced widespread tornado activity across much of the Midwest and Central U.S. The most intense activity occurred on June 20, when multiple supercell thunderstorms produced numerous tornadoes across the Great Plains. Some of these tornadoes were large and intense, but for the most part only affected rural areas. The strongest of these tornadoes impacted Kansas and Nebraska. Another notable event occurred on June 22, when a series of 5 tornadoes struck the Louisville metropolitan area. One of these tornadoes caused severe damage at the famous Churchill Downs racetrack. Despite the number and intensity of some of the tornadoes, the outbreak caused no fatalities.

Meteorological synopsis 

On June 18, a total of 11 tornadoes touched down across the Great Plains and Midwest. These tornadoes were mostly weak or remained over open country. The worst of the damage was to trees and outbuildings.

On June 19, the Storm Prediction Center issued a moderate risk of severe weather for the Central Plains. By the evening hours, several tornadoes had touched down over rural areas. Most of these tornadoes were weak. However, an EF2 tornado caused significant damage near Cherryville, Missouri, and injured 3 people. Another EF2 tornado also caused considerable damage in Breckinridge County, Kentucky as well. An EF1 tornado caused severe damage south of Du Quoin, Illinois and injured 1 person.

During the afternoon of June 20, a particularly dangerous situation (PDS) tornado watch was issued for much of central Nebraska and north-central Kansas due to the threat of significant tornadoes. Additionally, very large hail, at least  in diameter, was expected within the watch area. Around 1:00 p.m. local time, storm chasers reported a large EF3 tornado on the ground north of Hill City, Kansas and again later that afternoon near Elm Creek, Nebraska. Numerous other tornadoes were reported across the region including near Ravenna and in York County, some reported to have been very large and intense, but mostly over open country. However, some of the tornadoes impacted numerous rural farmsteads, and caused severe damage. Several of these tornadoes reached EF3 intensity. Tornado warnings stretched from North Dakota to Kansas. Additionally, a major derecho event developed farther south – a PDS Severe Thunderstorm Watch was issued for parts of Oklahoma and North Texas as well. On June 21, tornado watches were issued for several areas, including central Minnesota and Wisconsin, southern Illinois and parts of Missouri, and lower Michigan. Tornadoes were reported in Anoka County, Minnesota, and Green Lake and Fond du Lac Counties in Wisconsin. Several tornadoes touched down across the area, causing mostly minor damage. Additionally, local law enforcement reported a tornado in Allegan County in Michigan, with photos taken also showing what looked like a tornado, but no damage was seen in the area, and the National Weather Service determined it to have been low hanging clouds. Meanwhile, a major derecho event impacted the Chicago Metropolitan Area. The worst damage was in Wheeling, Illinois.

A series of tornadoes tracked across the Louisville, Kentucky area late on June 22. A total of five tornadoes were confirmed in the area, including two that were rated EF2. One of the tornadoes directly hit Churchill Downs racetrack severely damaging several buildings on the site. Other significant damage was reported in several industrial parks in the metropolitan area with buildings heavily damaged. A few other tornadoes caused minor damage in Indiana, Tennessee, Mississippi, and Michigan.

Tornadoes

June 18 event

June 19 event

June 20 event

June 21 event

June 22 event

References

External links
For the latest severe weather information:
National Weather Service
Storm Prediction Center

06-22
Tornadoes in Kansas
Tornadoes in Texas
Tornadoes in Illinois
Tornadoes in Oklahoma
Tornadoes in Nebraska
Tornadoes in Wisconsin
Tornado outbreak